Bathilde (minor planet designation: 441 Bathilde) is a large main belt asteroid that was discovered by French astronomer Auguste Charlois on 8 December 1898 in Nice. 441 Bathilde is orbiting close to a 5:2 mean motion resonance with Jupiter, which is located at .

10μ radiometric data collected from Kitt Peak in 1975 gave a diameter estimate of 64 km.

References

External links
 
 

Background asteroids
Bathilde
Bathilde
M-type asteroids (Tholen)
Xk-type asteroids (SMASS)
18981208